Ace Ventura: Pet Detective is an animated television series based on the film of the same name. The series was produced by Morgan Creek Productions, Funbag Animation Studios, Nelvana Limited, for the first two seasons and Odyssey Entertainment for the third and final season. It aired for two seasons from 1995 to 1997 on CBS. A third season and reruns of previous episodes aired on Nickelodeon from 1999 to 2000.

Ace Ventura: Pet Detective  was one of three animated series based on Jim Carrey movies premiering in the same year; the others are the 1995-1997 The Mask: Animated Series, and the 1995-1996 Dumb and Dumber series.

Overview
The series is a sequel of the Ace Ventura movies. The titular character, voiced by Canadian actor Michael Daingerfield (credited as Michael Hall), is a goofy private investigator with a predilection for animals of all species.

The series ran on CBS for two seasons, with a third season airing on Nickelodeon when the channel acquired the show to broadcast reruns. Many of the characters from the movie were retained, though not voiced by their original actors. While the original movies already had a strongly cartoonish comedic aesthetic, they were eclipsed by the slapstick, garish, and gormless humor attempts of the cartoon. Seth MacFarlane was among the writers over the course of the show's run, displaying similar humor to his later series.

The show was filled with toilet humor and anachronisms (one episode centered around the Egyptian Mau, claiming it to be an extinct breed of cat, when, if truth be told, they are not). Despite running in a time slot after The Mask (another popular Jim Carrey-based cartoon) and a crossover with that show (in that series' finale, "The Aceman Cometh"), the series attempted to gain a large audience and failed (with the podcast “Saturday Mourning Cartoons” declaring it trite and it must go in the “dip” from Who Framed Roger Rabbit) Ultimately, both The Mask and Ace Ventura were cancelled. A third season of the series ran on Nickelodeon from 1999 until 2000.

A computer game, Ace Ventura, was based on the show and (more questionably) the movies.

Voice cast
 Michael Hall as Ace Ventura
 Richard Binsley as Spike
 Vince Corazza as Mr. Schickadance
 Pam Hyatt as Atrocia Odora
 Bruce Tubbe as Emilio
 Al Waxman as Aguado
 Kevin Michael Richardson as Phatteus Lardus
 Rob Paulsen as Stanley Ipkiss / The Mask

Episodes

Series overview

Season 1 (1995–1996)

Season 2 (1996–1997)

Season 3 (1999–2000)

Crossover
A two-part crossover between Ace Ventura: Pet Detective and The Mask, another animated series based on a Jim Carrey film, aired on August 30, 1997. The crossover begins with The Mask episode "The Aceman Cometh", and concludes with the Ace Ventura episode "Have Mask, Will Travel". At the time of the original airing, Ace Ventura: Pet Detective was running in the adjoining time slot immediately following The Mask in CBS's Saturday morning lineup. During the crossover, Stanley/Mask and Ace retain their respective animation styles while appearing within the other's show. The crossover also serves as the second-season finale of Ace Ventura and the series finale of The Mask.

In "The Aceman Cometh", Stanley Ipkiss's dog Milo has his brain switched with that of a scientist and is then dog-napped. Stanley in turn hires Ace to help get him back. At the end of the episode, Spike steals the mask, and Stanley follows them to Miami to retrieve it. In "Have Mask, Will Travel", Stanley catches up to Ace just as he is recruited to solve a case on a space station, leading Stanley to become the Mask and join the investigation.

Home media
A three-episode DVD of the show was bundled with the two Ace Ventura movies. The back of the package has a mistake in the description of the pilot episode "The Reindeer Hunter", stating that Santa's main reindeer, Rudolph, has been abducted when in truth, Rudolph is not in the episode at all, rather it was the rest of his reindeer that had been abducted. This was also the only DVD release of this show. The show's rights are now with Revolution Studios (who acquired the Morgan Creek Entertainment library in 2014), with distribution handled by Sony Pictures Television.

Notes

References

External links
 
 

Ace Ventura
1990s American animated television series
2000s American animated television series
1995 American television series debuts
2000 American television series endings
1990s Canadian animated television series
2000s Canadian animated television series
1995 Canadian television series debuts
2000 Canadian television series endings
American children's animated adventure television series
American children's animated comedy television series
Canadian children's animated adventure television series
Canadian children's animated comedy television series
English-language television shows
Nickelodeon original programming
Animated television shows based on films
Television series by Nelvana
Television series by Warner Bros. Television Studios
Television series by Sony Pictures Television
Television shows set in Florida
CBS original programming
Environmental television
Television series by Morgan Creek Productions
American detective television series
American sequel television series
Television shows filmed in Toronto